The Tournament is a novel in the form of sports-reportage written in 2002 by New Zealand-born Australian satirist John Clarke, depicts a fictional international tennis tournament held in Paris and featuring a variety of notable twentieth-century literary, cultural and scientific figures as competitors.

Several other identities appear: Charles Darwin as the tournament referee, for example, and Friedrich Nietzsche as the "president and CEO of Nike". Oscar Wilde and James McNeill Whistler provide commentary. Roland Barthes, Emmeline Pankhurst, George Plimpton, Norman Mailer and many others appear as sports reporters covering the match. A demonstration doubles match features Henrik Ibsen and Claude Monet vs. Henry James and Mark Twain.

Coaches
 United States: Ernie Hemingway

Spectators
 Nelson Algren

Players in the tournament

Men 
Louis Armstrong
Jean Arp
Fred Astaire
W. H. Auden
Léon Bakst
Béla Bartók
Sam Beckett
Bix Beiderbecke
Walter Benjamin
John Betjeman
Ambrose Bierce
Jorge Luis Borges
Bertolt Brecht
Bill Burroughs
Karel Čapek
Hoagy Carmichael
Rudolf Carnap
Ray Chandler
Marc Chagall
Charlie Chaplin
Tony Chekhov
Joseph Conrad
Salvador Dalí
Willem de Kooning
Cecil B. DeMille
Marcel Duchamp
Albert Einstein
SuperTom Eliot
Duke Ellington
Maurits Escher
William Faulkner
Enrico Fermi
Bill Fields
Ford Maddox Ford
Sigmund "The Doc" Freud
John Galsworthy
Henri Gaudier-Brzeska
George Gershwin
Ira Gershwin
Thomas Hardy
Lafcadio Hearn
Martin Heidegger
Hermann Hesse
Fred Hitchcock
Aldous Huxley
Christopher Isherwood
Scott Joplin
James Joyce
Attila József
Carl Jung
Franz Kafka
Nikos Kazantzakis
Buster Keaton
John Maynard Keynes
Paul Klee
Gustav Klimt
Arthur Koestler
Jiddu Krishnamurti
Jacques Lacan
Ring Lardner
D. H. Lawrence
David Low
Ernst Lubitsch
Louis MacNeice
René Magritte
Gustav Mahler
André Malraux
Osip Mandelstam
Thomas Mann
Groucho Marx
Henri Matisse
Willie Maugham
Vladimir Mayakovski
Alan Milne
Edwin Muir
Edvard "Eddie" Munch
Vladimir Nabokov
Pablo Neruda
Vaslav Nijinsky
Seán O'Casey
George Orwell
Ignacy Jan Paderewski
Boris Pasternak
Pablo Picasso
Luigi Pirandello
Cole Porter
Ezra Pound
Sergei Prokofiev
Marcel Proust
Giacomo Puccini
Rainer Maria Rilke
Paul Robeson
Henri Rousseau
Damon Runyon
Salman Rushdie
Little Bertie Russell
Ernest Rutherford
Jean-Paul "JPS" Sartre
Jerry Salinger
Albert Schweitzer
Alexander Scriabin
Georges Seurat
Dmitri Shostakovich
Jean Sibelius
Benjamin "The Spockster" Spock
Lytton Strachey
Igor Stravinsky
Leo "The Count" Tolstoy
Arturo Toscanini
Henri Toulouse-Lautrec
Vincent van Gogh
Evelyn Waugh
Fats Waller
Herbie Wells
Butch Whitman
William Carlos Williams
Ludwig Wittgenstein
Plum Wodehouse
Frank Lloyd Wright
Big Bill Yeats

Women
Anna Akhmatova
Hannah Arendt
Nancy Astor
Josephine Baker
Tallulah Bankhead
Sylvia Beach
Simone de Beauvoir
Sylvia Beach
Sarah Bernhardt
Annie Besant
Enid Blyton
Willa Cather
Coco Chanel
Isadora Duncan
Amelia Earhart
Greta Garbo
Mary Garden
Mata Hari
Lillian Hellman
Frances Hodgkins
Frida Kahlo
Melanie Klein
Rosa Luxemburg
Mary McCarthy
Nadezhda Mandelstam
Katherine Mansfield
Nellie Melba
Margaret Mitchell
Maria Montessori
Georgia O'Keeffe
Dorothy Parker
Anna Pavlova
Mary Pickford
Ayn Rand
Leni Riefenstahl
Eleanor Roosevelt
Vita Sackville-West
Christina Stead
Gertrude Stein
Marie Stopes
Edna St Vincent Millay
Gloria Swanson
Mae West
Virginia Stephen-Woolf
Sybil Thorndike
Marguerite Yourcenar

2002 Australian novels
Sports novels
Satirical novels
Novels set in Paris

Australian comedy novels